Classical Armenian orthography, traditional orthography or Mashtotsian orthography ( in classical orthography and  in reformed orthography, Hayereni tasagan ughakrutyun), is the orthography that was developed by Mesrop Mashtots in the 5th century for writing Armenian and reformed during the early 19th century. Today, it is used primarily by the Armenian diaspora, including all Western Armenian speakers and Eastern Armenian speakers in Iran, which has rejected the Armenian orthography reform of Soviet Armenia during the 1920s. In the Armenian diaspora, some linguists and politicians allege political motives behind the reform of the Armenian alphabet.

Classical Armenian orthography uses 38 letters: the original 36 letters of the Armenian alphabet invented by Mesrop Mashtots during the 5th century, and the 2 additional letters included later in the Armenian alphabet during the Middle Ages.

It uses also 2 letters that were added to the Armenian alphabet in the 13th century:

Vowels

Monophthongs
Armenian has eight monophthongs and ten symbols to represent them. The pronunciation in the examples is Western Armenian. They will be shown here with International Phonetic Alphabet:

{| class="wikitable" style="text-align:center;"
! rowspan="2" |
! colspan=2| Front
! rowspan=2| Central
! rowspan="2" |Back
|-
! Unrounded || Rounded 
|-
! align="left" | Close
| class="nounderlines" style="text-align:center" |    ||    || || class="nounderlines" style="text-align:center" |   
|-
! align="left" | Mid
| class="nounderlines" style="text-align:center" |    ||   || class="nounderlines" style="text-align:center" |    || class="nounderlines" style="text-align:center;" |   
|-
!Open
|
|
|
|  
|}

— ,

— , 
At the end of a word,  is always written  (never ).
At the beginning of a word,  is written . For example: , .
In the middle of a word before a vowel,  is written . For example: , .
When followed by two consonants within a root word,  is written .
For example:  → ,  → .
The following are exceptions: ,  and foreign proper nouns: , .

— 
 is always written . For example:  ("his"/"her") is written .

— 
 is always written . For example:  ("house") is written .

— , epenthetical
The  vowel is usually not written.

 is written in the following cases:
For example:  ("to desire") is written  because it stems from the noun  ("desire"). Also,  ("to drink") is written  because it stems from the noun  ("mouthful").
For example:  ("inadmissible") is written  because it is a derivative word that is formed from the prefix  ("un-") and the root  ("admissible").
 Within a word after the letters , if they are not followed by a vowel they represent .
 In line-breaking.
 At the end of words, to specify the article "the". Also,  ("the statues") does the same.

— 
 is always written . For example:  ("village") is written .

— 
 is a rare sound to write foreign words and is always written . For example: the female name  ("Eugenie") is written , a transcription of letters.

Diphthongs

 is written differently depending on its context.

 at the start of a word is written . For example:  ("Yanikian", a family name) is written .
Preceded by a consonant, it is written . For example:  ("room") is written . However, at the end of a word,  is written . For example:  ("daily") is written . (This rule does not apply to the Classical Armenian imperatives փրկեա՛, ողորմեա՛, etc.)
For example:  ("station") is written .
A disyllabic sequence of a monophthong and a diphthong is written  ( when at the end of a word).  For example:  ("together") is written .
For example:  ("being", the noun) is written .

 is written differently depending on its context.
At the start of a word, it is written . For example:  ("dream") is written .  between two consonants represents  (see above for details).
In the middle of a word,  is written . For example:  ("mirror") is written .  at the start of a word represents  (see below for details).
At the end of a word,  is written  (never ). For example:  ("look!") is written .

— ; occurs in 
 is never at the start of a word and is written differently depending on its context:
A disyllabic sequence of a monophthong and a diphthong is written .
Otherwise,  is written .  For example:  ("May") is written .  at the start of a word represents  (see below for details).

— 
 is always written . For example:  ("seven") is written .

 is written differently depending on its context:
At the start of a word,  is written . For example:  ("oil") is written .
For example:  ("firm") is written .  at the start of a word represents  (see below for an example).
The disyllabic sequence of the monophthong  and the diphthong  is written . For example:  ("union") is written .
The disyllabic sequence of the monophthong  and the diphthong  is written . For example:  ("essence") is written .
To write the suffix ,  is used. For example:  ("knowledge") is written .

— 
 can occur at the end of a word only for monosyllabic words. It is written .

— 
 is written . For example:  ("tea") is written .

— 
 is written . For example:  ("to fall") is written .

— 
 usually occurs in the middle of a word, and is written . For example:  ("sister") is written .

Consonants
The International Phonetic Alphabet shows the consonants, by the corresponding Armenian letter in parentheses. Both Classical And Eastern Armenian maintain a three-way distinction between voiced, voiceless, and aspirated stops and affricates. In Western Armenian, voiced and aspirated stops and affricates have undergone a merger, and voiceless stops and affricates have become voiced.

Notes

References

External links
Arak29 Learn Classical Orthography
Arak29 Etymology
 glottothèque - Ancient Indo-European Grammars online, an online collection of video lectures on Ancient Indo-European languages, including videos the writing system of Classical Armenian

Armenian Orthography converters
 Nayiri.com (integrated orthography converter: reformed to traditional)

Armenian alphabet